Fish in a Bottle ltd. (or fishinabottle) is a creative digital agency based in Leamington Spa, United Kingdom specialising in browser game development (including casual games and games based viral marketing), website development and social network design and development. The agency was incorporated in 2003 and has worked for clients in television broadcasting, television production, video games publishing, retail and the public sector including the BBC, Channel 4, ITV, Disney, Leapfrog, Ogilvy & Mather, Turner Broadcasting, Nickelodeon, Barclays, Activision, Ubisoft, and Hat Trick Productions.

Notable work
Battle of Britain: 303 Squadron game — A browser based game that tells the story of the 303 Squadron commissioned by Channel 4 in conjunction with a television documentary produced by Darlow Smithson Productions. The game was developed using Adobe Flash and was notable for its high production quality and multiplayer technology.
BBC Blue Peter Keepy Uppy — Produced for BBC Blue Peter to celebrate the 2010 FIFA World Cup. The Adobe Flash browser based game is notable for its motion sensor detection that allows players with a webcam to interact with the game using their bodies rather than a traditional game controller or input device.
DJ Hero 2 Mix 2Gether — A browser based game viral campaign to market the launch of the video game DJ Hero 2 which was developed by FreeStyleGames and published by Activision. The viral game features music from the game and mix creation and challenge modes through social network facebook that are unique to the viral game.
Full English: The Game — A four chapter point and click adventure, Full English: The Game featured an original branching script, artwork and engine and was released in advance of the Full English television series as a pilot episode introducing the show's characters and tone.
IGGY.net — IGGY is an international social network for gifted students. The website facilitates content sharing, debate, and a gamified profile system. It also includes safeguarding and security features due to the nature of the audience.
Peppa Pig: Basketball and The New House — Browser based soft learning games designed for a preschool audience. The games featured the blending of cutscenes and gameplay to make the experience feel like a unique episode of Peppa Pig.
Phineas and Ferb Tower-inator — A browser based physics game in which users can both build their own tower as a part of the story mode, and may attempt to destroy other peoples' towers using a variety of projectiles.

Awards and nominations

References

External links
 

Video game companies of the United Kingdom
Video game development companies
Video game companies established in 2003
Marketing companies established in 2003
Digital marketing companies of the United Kingdom
Advertising agencies of the United Kingdom
Companies based in Leamington Spa
2003 establishments in England